Anood Al-Samerai is a British Southwark based councillor for British political party, the Liberal Democrats and leader of Southwark's Liberal Democrat Group.

Early life
Born in Southwark, London to an Iraqi father and an English mother. Al-Samerai had lived in Kuwait prior to reaching the age of ten with both her parents until she later moved to London due to the occurrence of the first Gulf war.

Career
From 2004, Al-Samerai managed the Liberal Democrats MP Simon Hughes office, with previous experience working within the British public sector including work for Guy's Hospital, as well as working abroad in orphanages both in Bosnia and Bulgaria. She has also served as councillor in Southwark since 2007. She was the Lib Dem Candidate for Ilford South in the 2010 General Election, finishing 3rd with 8,679 votes (17.0% of the total).

In May 2010 she was elected Lib Dem group leader after the 2010 election, with Paul Noblet as her Deputy. She continued in that role after 2014 election.

References

External links
 Official Cllr Anood Al-Samerai Webpage
 Anood Al-Samerai Official Page at Openly Local
 Anood Al-Samerai PPC for Ilford South Profile

Living people
Liberal Democrats (UK) councillors
Councillors in the London Borough of Southwark
English people of Iraqi descent
British politicians of Iraqi descent
Year of birth missing (living people)
Women councillors in England